Capricornia boisduvaliana is a moth belonging to the family Tortricidae. The species was first described by Philogène Auguste Joseph Duponchel in 1836.

It is native to Eurasia.

References

Olethreutinae